Sun Valley Airport  is a privately owned public-use airport and residential airpark located  south of the central business district of Bullhead City, in Mohave County, Arizona, United States.

Facilities and aircraft 
For the 12-month period ending May 2, 2007, the airport had 14,400 general aviation aircraft operations, an average of 39 per day. At that time there were 22 aircraft based at this airport: 91% single-engine and 9% multi-engine.

References

External links 
 Sun Valley Airport, official site
 Sun Valley Airport (A20) at Arizona DOT airport directory
 

Airports in Mohave County, Arizona
Residential airparks